Feyyaz is a Turkish spelling of the Arabic masculine given name Fayyad (Arabic: فَيَّاض fayyāḍ) which means "elaborate, flowing, plentiful, abundant". The Persian spelling is Fayyaz.

People named Feyyaz include:

 Feyyaz Berker, Turkish businessman
 Feyyaz Uçar, Turkish footballer

Turkish masculine given names